Nenad Sudarov (born January 1, 1975 in Kikinda) is an ITU- listed Olympic and Half Ironman distance triathlete from Serbia. Notable achievements include 25-30 age group champion of Europe 2005 and three straight wins at Mljet Half Ironman, Island of Mljet, Croatia.

He lives in Novi Sad.

Championships 

 Winner of the race series YUTU Cup and in 1999, 2000, 2001
 Winner Open Championship Bulgaria 2001 Sofia
 Winner of the Balkan Championship 2000 Sofia (Bulgaria)
 Winner FashonTriatlon PRO 2001-BARCS (Hungary)
 Winner Toš Triathlon 2001 Kiskunhalas (Hungary)
 Winner FIAT Triathlon 2001 Kiskunhalas (Hungary)
 Winner Half-Iron Man 2001-Mljet (Croatia)
 Absolute champion in the Balkan Championships Istanbul-Turkey 2002
 2002 Leader of Yugoslavia in the Novi Sad
 Winner YU TU CUP 2002
 First place at the Iron Man Mljet-Croatia 2002
 2003 SCG Triathlon Championship - 1st place
 2003 Winner SCG Cup
 2003 Half Ironman (Mljet) Croatia 1st place
 2003 Half Ironman (Tiszafurdo) Hungary 1st place
 2004 SCG Cup 1st place
 2004 Winner SCG Cup
 2004 Citroen Triathlon (Hodmezovasarhely) Hungary 1st place

References

External links 
Pansport
 ITU profile

Serbian male triathletes
Sportspeople from Kikinda
1975 births
Living people